Kathavarayan is a 1958 Indian Tamil-language Hindu mythological film produced and directed by T. R. Ramanna, and written by Thuraiyur K. Murthy. A remake of the 1941 film Aryamala, it stars Sivaji Ganesan and  Savitri. The film was released on 7 November 1958.

Plot 

Due to quarrel between Lord Shiva and Shakti, Shakti and her son Veerabahu are cursed to be born on Earth and live as mortals. Veerabahu is Kathavarayan whom the tribals adopt and he becomes the prince of the mountains. Kathavarayan grows up and goes on a world tour, his mother Shakti blesses him with the divine power of transforming into any form he wishes when he is in danger. During his quests Kathavarayan falls in love with Princess Aryamala. Aryamala is reborn to a Rajaguru who predicts a tragic life for her, but the King adopts her and names her Aryamala. But the King is against their love. Kathavarayan is arrested by the King and taken to be impaled when Shakti prays to Shiva who saves him. Kaathavarayan and Aryamala live happily thereafter.

Cast 
Sivaji Ganesan as Kathavarayan
K. Savithri as Princess Aryamala
P. Kannamba as Goddess Parvathi / Kamakshi
E. V. Saroja as Swarnam
M. N. Rajam as Aravalli
T. S. Balaiah as Chinnan
K. A. Thangavelu as General
J. P. Chandrababu as Mannaru
E. R. Sahadevan as King Aryan
O. A. K. Thevar as Gypsy's head

Production 
Kathavarayan was adapted from Aryamala (1941). It was produced and directed by T. R. Ramanna under R. R. Pictures, and written by Thuraiyur K. Murthy. Cinematography was handled by T. K. Rajabathar, and editing by M. S. Mani and T. Durai Rajan. The original lead actor was M. G. Ramachandran, who withdrew due to creative differences with Ramanna, resulting in Sivaji Ganesan replacing him. To differentiate Kathavarayan from Aryamala, Ramanna added a number of song and dance sequences.

Soundtrack 
The music was composed by G. Ramanathan. All songs are penned by Thanjai N. Ramaiah Dass. Some of the songs such as "Vaa Kalaba Mayile" and "Vidhiya Sadhiya" became huge hits.

Release and reception 
Kathavarayan was released on 7 November 1958. Kumudam, in its review, gave the film a single line remark: "Kattharavaayan" (a pun on the film's title and the Tamil word for shouting), reflecting on how it looked like a photographed play with most of the focus on aggressive dialogue delivery, similar to Parasakthi (1952).

References

External links 
 

1950s Tamil-language films
1958 films
Films directed by T. R. Ramanna
Films scored by G. Ramanathan
Hindu mythological films
Remakes of Indian films